Thomas Edward Godwin (1912–1975) was an English cyclist who held the world cycling record for most miles covered in a year and the fastest completion of .

In 1939, Godwin entered the Golden Book of Cycling as the greatest long-distance rider in the world. This record stood until 2016.

Early life
Godwin was born in 1912 in Stoke on Trent. To help support his family he worked as a delivery boy for a greengrocer (or newsagent) and with the job came a heavy bike with metal basket. The basket was hacked off and the 14-year-old Godwin won his first  time trial in 65 minutes.

Cycling

Amateur career

After his initial time trial success he subsequently clocked inside 1 hour 2 minutes for 25 miles on four occasions, and covered 236 miles in 12 hours.

In 1933 he finished 7th in the Best All-rounder road riding competition, open to all amateur cyclists in the United Kingdom. His average speed was 21.255 mph. His individual performances were:
 50 miles, 2 hours 10 mins 12 secs, (23.077 mph)
 100 miles, 4hrs, 40 mins, 6 secs, (21.428 mph)
 12 hours – 231 5/8 miles. (19.25 mph)

Professional career

Godwin left his amateur status at Potteries CC to join Rickmansworth Cycling Club as a professional. After more than 200 road and time trial wins, the mileage record beckoned.

World endurance records

In 1911 the weekly magazine Cycling began a competition for the highest number of 100-mile rides or "centuries" in a single year. The winner was Marcel Planes with 332 centuries in which he covered . The inspiration for the competition was said to be the efforts of Harry Long, a commercial traveller who rode a bicycle on his rounds covering every part of England and Scotland and who covered  in 1910. The world record for distance cycled in a year began in an era when bicycle companies competed to show their machines were the most reliable. The record was officially established nine times up to 1939. A tenth claim in 1972, by the English rider Ken Webb, was later disallowed.

In January 2016 Godwin's very long-standing record was broken. The American Kurt Searvogel completed  in one year, confirmed by the Ultramarathon Cycling Association, and this was later also recognised by the Guinness Book of Records.

In 1937 the Australian Ossie Nicholson had regained his record from Briton Walter Greaves by covering . At 5 am on 1 January 1939 Godwin set out to bring the record home. He wasn't alone; two other British riders started that day, Edward Swann and Bernard Bennett. Swann crashed after , but Bennett fought it out with Godwin for the rest of the year. Godwin was sponsored by the Raleigh Bicycle Company and Sturmey-Archer.

As war came, he rode through blackouts, his lights taped to a glow. Silk knickers were substituted for chamois inserts and Godwin maintained his vegetarian diet. For the first two months, Godwin's mileage lagged  behind Nicholson's schedule. Godwin increased his daily average beyond  a day, and on 21 June 1939 completed  in 18 hours, his longest ride of the record.

On 26 October 1939, Godwin rode into Trafalgar Square having completed , gaining the record with two months to spare. He rode through the winter to complete  in the year.

In May 1940 after 500 days' riding he secured the  record as well. Godwin dismounted and spent weeks learning how to walk before going to war in the RAF.

Later career

Godwin returned to cycling in 1945, keen to race as an amateur. However, despite a petition by fellow cyclists, the governing bodies ruled that having ridden as a professional he was barred from amateur status. Godwin became trainer and mentor to the Stone Wheelers. Godwin died aged 63, returning from a ride to Tutbury Castle with friends.

Commemoration
Godwin is commemorated by a plaque at Fenton Manor Sports Centre in Stoke on Trent that was unveiled in March 2005 by Edie Hemmings, the culmination of a 30-year campaign by her late husband, George.

Citation in the Golden Book
Godwin entered the Golden Book of Cycling on 31 December 1939. This recognised his record-breaking exploits for averaging over 200 miles a day for a year.

Notes

References

Further reading

External links
 Tommy Godwin section of Dave Barter's Cycling site.
 BBC – Information, Pictures and Audio
 TommyGodwin.com – The story of the greatest long-distance rider of all time

English male cyclists
Ultra-distance cyclists
1912 births
1975 deaths
Sportspeople from Stoke-on-Trent
Royal Air Force personnel of World War II